Shelby Dean Howard IV (born July 25, 1985) is a NASCAR driver. He is currently a free agent.

Racing career
Howard began racing in 1996 in Junior Sprints. In his first season in the National Series, he finished fifth in points. He competed in various racing series. He won the points championship in the Mini Cup Series, as well as winning the Mini Cup championship at the Jefferson Speedrome, and the 250cc Mini Sprints Rookie of the Year at Miami County Speedway. In 1998, he moved up to the 600cc Adult Class at Miami County, and simultaneously won the championship and Rookie of the Year honors. He also became the youngest driver to win a feature race at the Indianapolis Speedrome.

In 1999, Howard joined the Jasper Modified Series, and won the Rookie of the Year award and finished fifth in the points standings. He also raced at Anderson Speedway, winning two feature races and the Rookie of the Year award. He won his first Jasper Modified feature race in 2000 at Winchester Speedway, becoming the youngest driver since Jeff Gordon to win a race in that series. He finished fifteenth in the Kendall Late Model Series points standings as well. He moved up to the ARCA RE/MAX Series in 2001, becoming the youngest driver ever to compete at the age of 15. The next season, he won ARCA's Sportsmanship Award.

He won his first ARCA race in 2003, becoming the youngest winner in the series, and finished third in the final standings. That same season, he moved up to NASCAR, making his debut in the Busch Series at Kansas Speedway. He finished 20th in the #43 Dr Pepper Dodge fielded by the Curb Agajanian Performance Group. He also attempted his first Winston Cup race at Atlanta Motor Speedway, but failed to qualify. In 2004, he joined NASCAR's Craftsman Truck Series division, driving the new #23 Toyota Tundra for Bill Davis Racing. After eight races, he did not finish any higher than 21st, and was subsequently replaced by Johnny Benson. He ended the season running five races in the #35 Volvo Trucks/Snap-On Ford Taurus for Team Rensi Motorsports.

He joined Tony Stewart's USAR team in 2005, and had three poles and four top-tens in USAR's Northern Division. He had three wins in his first USAR season. In 2006, he returned to the Busch Series driving for Odle Motorsports at Memphis Motorsports Park. He finished 41st after being plagued by ignition failure. In 2007, he drove two races in the #01 for Johnny Davis Motorsports, his best finishing being a 27th at Kentucky Speedway. Howard returned to the Trucks with ThorSport Racing in 2008, but only managed two top tens and a single top five before he was released in favor of Johnny Sauter.

Howard started 2009 as a free agent, but was picked up by ML Motorsports to drive the #70 Foretravel Motorcoach Chevrolet after the team released Mark Green in late March. He would run a total of 17 Nationwide races with a best finish of 12th at the second Nashville race and Memphis Motorsports Park.

In 2010, Howard returned to ML Motorsports. Despite missing the season opening race at Daytona, Howard and ML ran 21 races with a best finish of 12th at Gateway and Iowa. Howard returned to ML in 2011, but departed from the team after Texas. He has not raced in NASCAR since then.

Motorsports career results

NASCAR
(key) (Bold – Pole position awarded by qualifying time. Italics – Pole position earned by points standings or practice time. * – Most laps led.)

Winston Cup Series

Nationwide Series

Camping World Truck Series

ARCA Re/Max Series
(key) (Bold – Pole position awarded by qualifying time. Italics – Pole position earned by points standings or practice time. * – Most laps led.)

References

External links
 

1985 births
Living people
NASCAR drivers
CARS Tour drivers
People from Greenwood, Indiana
Racing drivers from Indiana
Racing drivers from Indianapolis
ARCA Menards Series drivers